George Webster (31 July 1885 – 18 January 1941) was a British swimmer. He competed at the 1912 Summer Olympics and the 1920 Summer Olympics.

References

External links
 

1885 births
1941 deaths
British male swimmers
British male backstroke swimmers
Olympic swimmers of Great Britain
Swimmers at the 1912 Summer Olympics
Swimmers at the 1920 Summer Olympics
Sportspeople from Halifax, West Yorkshire